Pleasantville is a city in Atlantic County, in the U.S. state of New Jersey. As of the 2020 United States census, the city's population was 20,629, an increase of 380 (+1.9%) from the 2010 census count of 20,249, which in turn reflected an increase of 1,237 (+6.5%) from the 19,012 counted in the 2000 census.

Pleasantville was originally incorporated as a borough by an act of the New Jersey Legislature on January 10, 1889, from portions of Egg Harbor Township, based on the results of a referendum held on December 15, 1888. Pleasantville was incorporated as a city on April 14, 1914, replacing Pleasantville borough, based on the results of a referendum held that same day. the city was named by David Ingersoll for its surroundings.

The city had the eighth-highest property tax rate in New Jersey, with an equalized rate of 4.903% in 2020, compared to 2.560% in the county as a whole and a statewide average of 2.279%.

Geography
According to the U.S. Census Bureau, the city had a total area of 7.28 square miles (18.86 km2), including 5.72 square miles (14.82 km2) of land and 1.56 square miles (4.05 km2) of water (21.46%). Unincorporated communities, localities and place names located partially or completely within the city include Mount Pleasant, Risleyville and Smiths Landing.

The city borders the Atlantic County municipalities of Absecon, Atlantic City, Egg Harbor Township, Northfield, and Ventnor City.

Demographics

2020 census

Note: the US Census treats Hispanic/Latino as an ethnic category. This table excludes Latinos from the racial categories and assigns them to a separate category. Hispanics/Latinos can be of any race.

2010 census
	

The Census Bureau's 2006–2010 American Community Survey showed that (in 2010 inflation-adjusted dollars) median household income was $39,560 (with a margin of error of +/− $4,092) and the median family income was $48,873 (+/− $5,405). Males had a median income of $32,494 (+/− $4,209) versus $29,961 (+/− $2,187) for females. The per capita income for the borough was $18,527 (+/− $1,356). About 12.2% of families and 18.2% of the population were below the poverty line, including 24.7% of those under age 18 and 32.3% of those age 65 or over.

Economy
Portions of the city are part of an Urban Enterprise Zone (UEZ), one of 32 zones covering 37 municipalities statewide. Pleasantville was selected in 1994 as one of a group of 10 zones added to participate in the program and one of four of those chosen based on a competition. In addition to other benefits to encourage employment and investment within the UEZ, shoppers can take advantage of a reduced 3.3125% sales tax rate (half of the % rate charged statewide) at eligible merchants. Established in March 1995, the city's Urban Enterprise Zone status expires in March 2026. By 2019, there had been 169 businesses that had been certified to participate in the city's UEZ program.

Sports
In 1945, the Boston Red Sox held their spring training at Ansley Field in Pleasantville, rather than in Florida, due to travel restrictions related to World War II. The New York Yankees were based at Bader Field in Atlantic City and the two clubs played a series of eight exhibition games against each other with wartime restrictions in intercity travel in place.

Laoma Byrd's Gym, formally known as the South Jersey Athletic Club, operated professionally from the mid-1940s to 1960s. This gym, which was located on West Wright Street, became a tourist destination after it was adapted as a boxing gym by top amateurs and pro fighters. Many noted boxers had  trained there, including Ezzard Charles, Jersey Joe Walcott, Sonny Liston, Johnny Bratton, Johnny Saxton, Ike Williams, Ernie Terrell, and numerous professional fighters from the local area.

Government

Local government
Pleasantville operates under the City form of New Jersey municipal government, one of 15 municipalities (of the 564) statewide that use this traditional form of government. The governing body is comprised of the Mayor and the seven-member City Council, all of whom are elected in partisan elections as part of the November general election. The Mayor is elected to a four-year term of office. The City Council is comprised of one member elected at-large and six members elected from each of two wards to three-year terms of office on a staggered basis, with two seats up for election each year in a three-year cycle.

Augustus Harmon was appointed in November 2011 to fill the seat of his brother, Johnson Harmon, who died before the election in which he had won a fifth term of office.

In September 2016, the City Council appointed Nolan Q. Allen to fill the Ward 1 seat expiring in December 2017 that had been held by Lincoln Green Sr. until his death the previous month. Nolan served on an interim basis until the November 2016 general election, when he was chosen to serve the balance of the term.

, the Mayor of the City of Pleasantville is Democrat Judy Ward, whose term of office ends December 31, 2024. Members of the City Council are Council President Ricky Cistrunk (D, 2023; Ward 1), Victor M. Carmona (D, Ward 2; elected to serve an unexpired term), Bertilio "Bert" Correa (D, 2024; Ward 2), Lawrence "Tony" Davenport (D, 2024; Ward 1), Joanne Famularo (D, 2023; Ward 2), Stanley C. Swan Jr. (D, 2022; Ward 1) and Carla Thomas (D, 2023; at-large).

Federal, state, and county representation
Pleasantville is located in the 2nd Congressional District and is part of New Jersey's 2nd state legislative district.

 

Atlantic County is governed by a directly elected county executive and a nine-member Board of County Commissioners, responsible for legislation. The executive serves a four-year term and the commissioners are elected to staggered three-year terms, of which four are elected from the county on an at-large basis and five of the commissioners represent equally populated districts. , Atlantic County's Executive is Republican Dennis Levinson, whose term of office ends December 31, 2023. Members of the Board of County Commissioners are:

Ernest D. Coursey, District 1, including Atlantic City (part), Egg Harbor Township (part), and Pleasantville (D, 2022, Atlantic City), Chair Maureen Kern, District 2, including Atlantic City (part), Egg Harbor Township (part), Linwood, Longport, Margate City, Northfield, Somers Point and Ventnor City (R, 2024, Somers Point), Andrew Parker III, District 3, including Egg Harbor Township (part) and Hamilton Township (part) (R, Egg Harbor Township, 2023), Richard R. Dase, District 4, including Absecon, Brigantine, Galloway Township and Port Republic (R, 2022, Galloway Township), James A. Bertino, District 5, including Buena, Buena Vista Township, Corbin City, Egg Harbor City, Estell Manor, Folsom, Hamilton Township (part), Hammonton, Mullica Township and Weymouth Township (R, 2018, Hammonton), Caren L. Fitzpatrick, At-Large (D, 2023, Linwood), Frank X. Balles, At-Large (R, Pleasantville, 2024) Amy L. Gatto, Freeholder (R, 2022, Hamilton Township) and Vice Chair John W. Risley, At-Large (R, 2023, Egg Harbor Township)

Atlantic County's constitutional officers are: County Clerk Joesph J. Giralo (R, 2026, Hammonton), Sheriff Eric Scheffler (D, 2024, Northfield) and 
Surrogate James Curcio (R, 2025, Hammonton).

Politics
As of March 2011, there were a total of 9,193 registered voters in Pleasantville City, of which 4,693 (51.0% vs. 30.5% countywide) were registered as Democrats, 534 (5.8% vs. 25.2%) were registered as Republicans and 3,965 (43.1% vs. 44.3%) were registered as Unaffiliated. There was one voter registered to another party. Among the city's 2010 Census population, 45.4% (vs. 58.8% in Atlantic County) were registered to vote, including 62.6% of those ages 18 and over (vs. 76.6% countywide).

In the 2012 presidential election, Democrat Barack Obama received 5,675 votes (92.4% vs. 57.9% countywide), ahead of Republican Mitt Romney with 450 votes (7.3% vs. 41.1%) and other candidates with 23 votes (0.4% vs. 0.9%), among the 6,139 ballots cast by the city's 10,019 registered voters, for a turnout of 61.3% (vs. 65.8% in Atlantic County). In the 2008 presidential election, Democrat Barack Obama received 5,945 votes (89.7% vs. 56.5% countywide), ahead of Republican John McCain with 597 votes (9.0% vs. 41.6%) and other candidates with 22 votes (0.3% vs. 1.1%), among the 6,628 ballots cast by the city's 10,572 registered voters, for a turnout of 62.7% (vs. 68.1% in Atlantic County). In the 2004 presidential election, Democrat John Kerry received 4,301 votes (80.9% vs. 52.0% countywide), ahead of Republican George W. Bush with 900 votes (16.9% vs. 46.2%) and other candidates with 31 votes (0.6% vs. 0.8%), among the 5,316 ballots cast by the city's 8,942 registered voters, for a turnout of 59.4% (vs. 69.8% in the whole county).

In the 2013 gubernatorial election, Democrat Barbara Buono received 1,951 ballots cast (69.1% vs. 34.9% countywide), ahead of Republican Chris Christie with 675 votes (23.9% vs. 60.0%) and other candidates with 32 votes (1.1% vs. 1.3%), among the 2,824 ballots cast by the city's 10,324 registered voters, yielding a 27.4% turnout (vs. 41.5% in the county). In the 2009 gubernatorial election, Democrat Jon Corzine received 2,146 ballots cast (82.0% vs. 44.5% countywide), ahead of Republican Chris Christie with 370 votes (14.1% vs. 47.7%), Independent Chris Daggett with 45 votes (1.7% vs. 4.8%) and other candidates with 19 votes (0.7% vs. 1.2%), among the 2,617 ballots cast by the city's 9,844 registered voters, yielding a 26.6% turnout (vs. 44.9% in the county).

Education
Students in pre-kindergarten through twelfth grade are educated by the Pleasantville Public Schools. The district is one of 31 former Abbott districts statewide that were established pursuant to the decision by the New Jersey Supreme Court in Abbott v. Burke which are now referred to as "SDA Districts" based on the requirement for the state to cover all costs for school building and renovation projects in these districts under the supervision of the New Jersey Schools Development Authority.

As of the 2018–19 school year, the district, comprised of seven schools, had an enrollment of 3,757 students and 314.2 classroom teachers (on an FTE basis), for a student–teacher ratio of 12.0:1. Schools in the district (with 2018–19 enrollment data from the National Center for Education Statistics) are 
Decatur Avenue Early Childhood Center with NA students in grade Pre-K, Leeds Avenue School with 625 students in grades Pre-K–5, North Main Street School with 372 students in grades Pre-K–5, 
South Main Street School with 491 students in grades Pre-K–5, Washington Avenue School with 425 students in grades K–5, Pleasantville Middle School with 760 students in grades 6–8, and Pleasantville High School with 828 students in grades 9–12. Students from Absecon attend the district's high school for ninth through twelfth grades as part of a sending/receiving relationship with the Absecon Public School District. Absecon has sought to end its agreement with Pleasantville and send its students to Absegami High School under a new sending/receiving relationship with the Greater Egg Harbor Regional High School District that Absecon argues would give its students a better education at a lower cost, without negatively impacting the demographics in Pleasantville High School. About 10% of Absecon's graduating students have been choosing to attend Pleasantville High School, for which the Absecon district has been paying $18,000 per student each year.

City public school students are also eligible to attend the Atlantic County Institute of Technology in the Mays Landing section of Hamilton Township or the Charter-Tech High School for the Performing Arts, located in Somers Point.

On September 6, 2007, the FBI arrested five members of the Pleasantville school board as part of a federal corruption case that included several state lawmakers and other public officials. Included in the arrest sweep were Assemblymen Mims Hackett and Alfred E. Steele, and Passaic Mayor Samuel Rivera. Indictments were filed against four sitting members of the Board of Education, charging that they had accepted bribes to steer insurance or roofing business from the district. Charged were Jayson Adams (accused of accepting $15,000 in bribes), James McCormick ($3,500), James Pressley ($32,200) and Rafael Velez ($4,000). Former board member Maurice 'Pete' Callaway, a member of the Pleasantville City Council, was accused of accepting $13,000 in bribes as part of the scheme.

Transportation

Roads and highways

Highways that pass through Pleasantville include U.S. Route 9, U.S. Route 40, U.S. Route 322, and the Atlantic City Expressway.

Public transportation

NJ Transit offers bus service to Atlantic City, New Jersey and other intermediate stations on routes 502 (from Atlantic Cape Community College), 507 (from Ocean City), 508 (from Hamilton Mall), 509 (from Ocean City), 553 (limited; from Upper Deerfield Township), 554 (from Lindenwold station), and 559 (from Lakewood Township).

Beginning in 1907, the old Atlantic City and Shore Railroad provided electric interurban service to Pleasantville on its Atlantic City–Ocean City line. The railroad discontinued operation in 1948.

Notable people

People who were born in, residents of, or otherwise closely associated with Pleasantville include:
 Nia Ali (born 1988), track and field athlete, who specializes in the 100 m hurdles, heptathlon and other events
 Ellen Bass (born 1947), poet and author
 Sonora Webster Carver (1904–2003), first female horse diver
 Walter Evans Edge (1873–1956), politician who served as a United States Senator representing New Jersey from 1919 to 1929 and as Governor of New Jersey, from 1917 to 1919 and again from 1944 to 1947
 Dino Hall (born 1955), former American football running back and return specialist who played in the NFL for the Cleveland Browns
 Gene Hart (1931–1999), sports announcer for the Philadelphia Flyers of the National Hockey League and the Philadelphia Phantoms of the American Hockey League
 Ty Helfrich (1890–1955), former major league baseball player
 Rodney Jerkins (born 1977), Grammy Award-winning songwriter, record producer, and musician
 Amy Kennedy (born 1978), educator, mental health advocate and politician who is the Democratic Party nominee in the 2020 elections seeking to represent New Jersey's 2nd congressional district
 Simon Lake (1866–1945), mechanical engineer and naval architect
 Max Manning (1918–2003), pitcher in Negro league baseball who played for the Newark Eagles between 1938 and 1949
 Osun Osunniyi (born 1998), college basketball player for the St. Bonaventure Bonnies of the Atlantic 10 Conference
 Ralph Peterson Jr. (born 1962), jazz drummer and bandleader
 Blue Raspberry (born 1972 as Candi Lindsey), singer affiliated with Wu-Tang Clan
 Monique Samuels, television personality best known as a cast member of the reality television series The Real Housewives of Potomac
 Dave Vonner (born 1972), toy designer

References

External links

 Official Pleasantville website

 
1889 establishments in New Jersey
Cities in Atlantic County, New Jersey
City form of New Jersey government
New Jersey Urban Enterprise Zones
Populated places established in 1889